Municipal elections were held across the Indian state of Punjab on 14 February 2021. In Barnala district the elections were scheduled for a total of 72 wards of 4 different Municipal Corporations. The results were declared on 17 February.

Background

The previous elections were held in February 2015.

Voter statistics

Voter Turnout

Schedule 
Election Commission of Punjab announced the municipal election schedule on  16 January 2021.

Parties and alliances

Results

Results by councils

See also
 2021 Punjab, India local elections
 2017 Punjab Legislative Assembly election
 2019 Indian general election in Punjab
 2022 Punjab Legislative Assembly election
 2021 elections in India

References

2021 elections in India
Local elections in Punjab, India